Kameron Edwards (born November 2, 1997) is an American professional basketball player who last played for the Ontario Clippers of the NBA G League. He played college basketball for the Pepperdine Waves.

High school career
Edwards attended Etiwanda High School. He suffered a broken ankle as a sophomore. Edwards became a starter as a junior and averaged 13.6 points and a team-high 7.2 rebounds for the 27–5 Eagles. Edwards had a season-high 36 points against Gahr High School and had 29 points against Damien High School. He was a two-time All-Inland Valley and Baseline League selection as well as a first-team All-CIF selection as a senior. Edwards committed to Pepperdine on September 15, 2014.

College career
Edwards started 28 of 32 games for Pepperdine as a freshman, averaging 7.2 points and 4.2 rebounds per game, and was named to the West Coast Conference All-Freshman Team. Edwards was forced to miss the 2016–17 season with a fractured jaw. He missed five games in December 2017 with a concussion. Edwards averaged 14.7 points, 6.4 rebounds, and 1.1 assists per game as a redshirt sophomore. As a junior, Edwards finished as Pepperdine's second-leading scorer (14.7 points per game) and top rebounder (6.2 per game) despite missing several games with a foot injury. He was named Honorable Mention All-WCC. In January 2020, Edwards was named one of 30 candidates for the Senior CLASS Award. Edwards averaged 16.2 points and 7.4 rebounds per game as a senior, earning Second Team All-WCC honors. He finished his career with 1,346 points.

Professional career
On May 31, 2020, Edwards signed with Kangoeroes Mechelen of the Pro Basketball League (PBL). In October 2021, he joined the Santa Cruz Warriors of the NBA G League after a successful tryout. However, he was waived on November 4.

Agua Caliente Clippers (2022)
On February 23, 2022, Edwards was acquired by the Agua Caliente Clippers of the NBA G League. He was then later waived on February 26, 2022, and then reacquired again on February 27, 2022.

Ontario Clippers (2022–2023)
On December 16, 2022, Edwards was reacquired by the Ontario Clippers. On February 4, 2023, Edwards was waived.

Career statistics

College

|-
| style="text-align:left;"| 2015–16
| style="text-align:left;"| Pepperdine
| 32 || 28 || 23.9 || .440 || .100 || .602 || 4.2 || 1.3 || .8 || .3 || 7.2
|-
| style="text-align:left;"| 2016–17
| style="text-align:left;"| Pepperdine
| style="text-align:center;" colspan="11"|  Redshirt
|-
| style="text-align:left;"| 2017–18
| style="text-align:left;"| Pepperdine
| 23 || 21 || 29.2 || .477 || .387 || .670 || 6.4 || 1.1 || .8 || .3 || 14.7
|-
| style="text-align:left;"| 2018–19
| style="text-align:left;"| Pepperdine
| 18 || 14 || 28.6 || .414 || .344 || .753 || 6.6 || 1.0 || .8 || .4 || 15.1
|-
| style="text-align:left;"| 2019–20
| style="text-align:left;"| Pepperdine
| 31 || 31 || 33.0 || .452 || .284 || .733 || 7.5 || 1.0 || 1.0 || .5 || 16.4
|- class="sortbottom"
| style="text-align:center;" colspan="2"| Career
| 104 || 94 || 28.6 || .448 || .310 || .690 || 6.1 || 1.1 || .9 || .4 || 12.9

Personal life
Edwards's younger brother, Kessler, played college basketball for Pepperdine and was his teammate for two seasons, and now plays professionally for the Sacramento Kings. Edwards earned his master's degree in legal studies.

References

External links
Pepperdine Waves bio

1996 births
Living people
Agua Caliente Clippers players
American expatriate basketball people in Belgium
American men's basketball players
Basketball players from Pasadena, California
Kangoeroes Basket Mechelen players
Pepperdine Waves men's basketball players
Small forwards